The Official Gazette is the government gazette of Barbados. It has been published within Bridgetown since 1966.

See also 
List of British colonial gazettes
The Courier (ACP-EU), an ACP-EU development magazine focusing on ACP-EU cooperation.

References

External links 

Barbados
Government of Barbados
Official Gazette
Publications established in 1966
1966 establishments in Barbados